The Tarsus Arena is a multi-sport indoor arena at Tarsus in Mersin Province, Turkey. Built in 1990, it is owned by the Youth Services and Sports Directoriate of Mersin and has a seating capacity of 1,500. It was renovated and modernized for use by the 2013 Mediterranean Games.

The venue is situated next to the Tarsus City Stadium. It is suitable for events of badminton, basketball, boxing, karate, volleyball, wrestling etc. The arena is home to Tarsus Belediyespor women's basketball team, which plays in the Turkish Women's Basketball League (TKBL). During the 2013 Mediterranean Games, the arena hosted boxing competitions on June 21–23.

References

Indoor arenas in Turkey
Basketball venues in Turkey
Volleyball venues in Turkey
Badminton venues
Boxing venues in Turkey
Sports venues in Mersin
Tarsus, Mersin
Sports venues completed in 1990
2013 Mediterranean Games venues
Badminton in Turkey